Steve Ellis (born 1952) is a British poet and literary scholar and Professor of English Literature at the University of Birmingham.
He is known for his works on Chaucer, Virginia Woolf and T. S. Eliot. and also for his verse translation of Dante's Divine Comedy, published in 2019.

Works
 Dante and English Poetry: Shelley to T. S. Eliot (1983)
 Home and Away (1987) 
 West Pathway (1993)
  Verse translation of Dante's Hell (1991)
 The English Eliot: Design, Language, and Landscape in Four Quartets (1991)
 British writers and the approach of World War II
 Chaucer at large: the poet in the modern imagination
 Chaucer: The Canterbury Tales
 T. S. Eliot: a guide for the perplexed
 Virginia Woolf and the Victorians

References

1952 births
20th-century British poets
21st-century British poets
British literary critics
Academics of the University of Birmingham
Alumni of University College London
Living people